The 2004 Carinthian state election was held on 7 March 2004 to elect the members of the Landtag of Carinthia.

The election was a victory for the first-term Freedom Party of Austria (FPÖ) government under Jörg Haider, which repeated its strong performance from the previous election. This came despite difficulties on the federal level and recent defeats in other state elections, as well as a strong challenge from the Social Democratic Party of Austria (SPÖ). The Austrian People's Party (ÖVP) lost almost half its voteshare, while The Greens won seats for the first time.

Background
Prior to amendments made in 2017, the Carinthian constitution mandated that cabinet positions in the state government (state councillors) be allocated between parties proportionally in accordance with the share of votes won by each; this is known as Proporz. As such, the government was a perpetual coalition of all parties that qualified for at least one state councillor.

In the 1999 state election, the FPÖ became the largest party in a state legislature for the first time in history, winning 42% of votes cast. FPÖ leader Jörg Haider became Governor.

Electoral system
The 36 seats of the Landtag of Carinthia are elected via open list proportional representation in a two-step process. The seats are distributed between four multi-member constituencies. For parties to receive any representation in the Landtag, they must either win at least one seat in a constituency directly, or clear a 5 percent state-wide electoral threshold. Seats are distributed in constituencies according to the Hare quota, with any remaining seats allocated using the D'Hondt method at the state level, to ensure overall proportionality between a party's vote share and its share of seats.

Contesting parties
The table below lists parties represented in the previous Landtag.

In addition to the parties already represented in the Landtag, three parties collected enough signatures to be placed on the ballot.

 The Greens – The Green Alternative (GRÜNE)
 Communist Party of Austria (KPÖ)
 SAU Party (SAU)

Results

Results by constituency

Notes

References

State elections in Austria
Carinthian state election
Carinthian state election